Birgit Sarrap (née Õigemeel, born 24 September 1988), also known as simply Birgit, is an Estonian singer. Õigemeel rose to prominence in 2007 after winning the first season of Eesti otsib superstaari, the Estonian version of Idol. Her debut self-titled studio album was later released in 2008. Õigemeel has gone on to release four other studio albums in her career.

Õigemeel represented Estonia in the Eurovision Song Contest 2013 with the song "Et uus saaks alguse" after winning Eesti Laul 2013. She qualified for the grand final, where she placed 20th.

Career

She started her musical career as a choir singer on Estonian Television children's choir and learned the violin at Kohila Music School.

Õigemeel is the first winner of Estonian Idol Eesti otsib superstaari. In 2007, at the Italian culture festival "L'Olivo d'Oro" (Golden Olive) Birgit was the first non-Italian to receive the "Golden Olive Branch" award.

Eurovision Song Contest
Õigemeel represented Estonia in the Eurovision Song Contest 2013 in Malmö, Sweden with the song "Et uus saaks alguse" ("So There Could Be a New Beginning"), qualifying from the first semi-final of the competition from 10th place, and placing 20th in the final, scoring 19 points.

Prior to the participation, she tried to enter the contest twice, in 2008 and 2012, but yet with no success. In 2002, when the contest was held in Tallinn, she was on stage during the interval act as a choir artist.

Theatre
Õigemeel has been involved with professional theatre productions: in 2007 she played the role of Sylvia in the stage play Two Gentlemen of Verona (written by William Shakespeare and directed by a well known Estonian director/actor Lembit Peterson) at the Estonian theatre . 

At the theatre Vanemuine, she has played Maria Von Trapp of The Sound of Music (opened in 2010) and appeared in supporting roles in a popular ethno musical Peko (premiered in 2011 as an open-air production in Värska). As of the autumn of 2016, she played Sophie in the Estonian production of Mamma Mia and had multiple supporting roles in a popular 2022 musical "Ada", based on life of Ada Ludver, Estonian legendary film actress and media personality. In her spare time she occasionally plays with an amateur company in her home town Kohila.

Personal life
Õigemeel is married to her manager Indrek Sarrap. She gave birth to their first child, a boy, in October 2013. Their second child, a girl was born in 2016. They live in Tallinn.

Õigemeel is the second youngest of four Õigemeel-sisters. With her siblings, Reelika, Sigrid and Kairi, Õigemeel has appeared also as a singing group either on television shows or local events.

Õigemeel's mother Astrid Õigemeel is a music teacher, while her father Riivu Õigemeel runs a local furniture company. They live in Kohila.

Discography

Albums
Birgit Õigemeel (2008)
Ilus aeg (2008)
Teineteisel pool (2009)
Uus algus (2013)
 V (2018)

Singles
Kas tead, mida tähendab... (13 November 2007)
365 Days (2008)
Homme (2008)
Ise (2008)
Last Christmas (2008)
Talve võlumaa (2008)
Moonduja (2009)
See öö (2009)
Põgenen (with Koit Toome) (2010)
Sinuga end elusana tunda võin (with Birgit Varjun) (2010)
Iialgi (with Violina) (2010)
Eestimaa suvi (2010)
Parem on ees (2011)
You're not alone (with Violina), Eesti Laul 2012, (2011)
Et uus saaks alguse, Eesti Laul 2013 and Eurovision 2013, (2012)
Sea of Life (with Violina) (2013)
Nii täiuslik see (2013)
Olen loodud rändama (2013)
Lendame valguskiirusel (2014)
Pea meeles head (with Ott Lepland) (2014)
Kolm kuud (2014)
Kingitus (2014)
Valge Saatan (with Tanja) (2015)
Alles sügisel mõtleme (2015)
Ma tean, et sa tead (2016)
Leekides tee (2016)
15 000 sammu (2018)

References

External links

1988 births
Living people
People from Kohila
Estonian pop singers
21st-century Estonian women singers
Estonian stage actresses
Contraltos
Idols (TV series) winners
Eurovision Song Contest entrants of 2013
Eurovision Song Contest entrants for Estonia
Eesti Laul winners